A list of records from the Australian Baseball League (1989-1999) & current Australian Baseball League.

Offensive Records

.400 season

Other
Most hits in a season: 78 from 208 at bats by Steve Hinton, in 1998.
Highest slugging rate: 1.083 by Brendan Kingman, in 1998.

Most Home Runs in a Season, 28 by Brendan Kingman, in 1998

Defensive Records (1989-1999)

Perfect Games
A perfect game has never been Pitched in the Australian Baseball League.

No Hitters

See also

Baseball in Australia

References

External links

Records